A Burial at Sea, by Charles Finch, is a set aboard a Royal Navy vessel in 1873 and in Egypt during the Victorian era.  It is the fifth novel in the Charles Lenox series.

Plot summary
Charles Lenox, gentleman and former amateur detective, is now a Member of Parliament, and his wife is expecting their first child. However, relations between the United Kingdom and France are increasing strained following the opening of the Suez Canal and several British agents have been murdered on French soil. Lenox is asked to undertake a secret mission to Egypt by Prime Minister Gladstone. However, the brutal murder of an officer on HMS Lucy has Lenox re-using his rusty investigation skills at the captain's request.

Publication history
A Burial at Sea was first published in hardcover by St. Martin’s Minotaur and released November 2011.  The trade paperback was released in August 2012.

Reception
Finch received favorable reviews in several major newspapers.  Publishers Weekly favorably compared Finch to Agatha Christie and Patrick O’Brian and said that  A Burial at Sea was "the best in the series to date."

References

External links
 A Burial at Sea Official Macmillan Page
 Review by Book Reporter

2011 American novels
Historical mystery novels
Novels set in Egypt
Fiction set in 1873
Novels set in the 1870s
Novels set in Victorian England
Novels by Charles Finch
Charles Lenox novels
St. Martin's Press books